Anderson County Courthouse may refer to:

Anderson County Courthouse (Kansas), Garnett, Kansas
Anderson County Courthouse (South Carolina), part of the Anderson Downtown Historic District (Anderson, South Carolina)
Anderson County Courthouse (Texas), Palestine, Texas